Robin may refer to:

Animals 
 Australasian robins, red-breasted songbirds of the family Petroicidae
 Many members of the subfamily Saxicolinae (Old World chats), including:
European robin (Erithacus rubecula)
Bush-robin 
Forest robin
Magpie-robin
Scrub-robin
Robin-chat, two bird genera
Bagobo robin
White-starred robin
White-throated robin
Blue-fronted robin
Larvivora (6 species)
Myiomela (3 species)
 Some red-breasted New-World true thrushes (Turdus) of the family Turdidae, including:
 American robin (T. migratorius) (so named by 1703)
 Rufous-backed thrush  (T. rufopalliatus)
 Rufous-collared thrush (T. rufitorques)
 Formerly other American thrushes, such as the clay-colored thrush (T. grayi)
 Pekin robin or Japanese (hill) robin, archaic names for the red-billed leiothrix (Leiothrix lutea), red-breasted songbirds
 Sea robin, a fish with small "legs" (actually spines)

Arts, entertainment, and media

Fictional characters
 Robin (character), Batman's crime fighting partner in the DC Comic Universe.
 Robin (Fire Emblem), the default name for the player's avatar in Fire Emblem Awakening
 Robin Hood, an outlaw in English folklore
 Robin Maxwell, a character in the American TV miniseries V (1983 miniseries) and V The Final Battle
 Sir Robin, the cowardly knight from the film Monty Python and the Holy Grail

Other uses in arts, entertainment, and media
 Robin (magazine), a British children's magazine published from 1953 to 1969
 "Robin" (The Hooded Man), a 1984 hit song by the Irish group Clannad
 Robin (TV series), cartoon created by Magnus Carlsson

Military
 HMS Robin, the name of two Royal Navy ships and a shore establishment
 USS Robin, the name of four U.S. Navy ships

People
 Robin (name), a common given name and a surname
 Robin (singer) (born 1998), Finnish teen pop singer (full name Robin Packalen)
 Robin (wrestler), Mexican masked professional wrestler

Transportation
 Robin, one of Apex Aircraft's brands
 Curtiss Robin, a monoplane introduced in 1928
 Reliant Robin, a three-wheeled car built by Reliant
 Robin Aircraft, a French manufacturer of light aeroplanes
 SS Robin, the world's oldest complete steam coaster (a class of steamship)

See also

 Robbie (disambiguation)
 Robi (disambiguation)
 Robina (disambiguation)
 Robins (disambiguation)
 Robyn (born 1979), Swedish singer
 Round-robin (disambiguation)
 
 

Animal common name disambiguation pages